SDM Law College, or in its full name Sri Dharmasthala Manjunatheshwara Law College, is a law school located in Kodialbail, Mangalore, Karnataka, India. It is affiliated with Karnataka State Law University. SDM Law college offers a five-year integrated  B.A. (L.L.B.) at undergraduate level, L.L.M. in corporate commercial law as well as a 3-year L.L.B degree.

Rankings
 
SDM Law College was ranked 21 among private law colleges in India by Outlook India in 2022.

Notable alumni
 S. Abdul Nazeer, Honorable Judge, Supreme Court of India 

 Antony Dominic, Former Chief Justice of Kerala High court

 K. Sudhakaran, Politician & member of Parliament 

 U. T. Khader, Member of Karnataka Legislative Assembly 

 Abdussalam Puthige, Writer and Journalist

References

External links
 

 Law schools in Karnataka
 Academic institutions formerly affiliated with the University of Mysore
 Educational institutions established in 1974
1974 establishments in Karnataka